Baiyyappanahalli Manavarthe Kaval or Old Baiyyappanahalli is one of the early settlements in Bengaluru. It is part of C. V. Raman Nagar Assembly constituency in East Bengaluru. This former village was included in the Bangalore Mahanagara Palike on 7 December 1995.

History
This village populated with 2742 inhabitants (1429 Male and 1313 Female) in 1981 and was considered as uninhabited during 1991 Census. It was merged with Vimanapura (which was then called as Baiyyappanahalli Vimanapura) which hosted 11441 citizens (6157 Male and 5284 Female) in 1981. Baiyyappanahalli NMCT (Non Municipal Census Town) consisted of Baiyyappanahalli Manavarthe Kaval, Benniganahalli and Baiyyappanahalli Vimanapura and was a home to 14905 persons (7873 Male and 7032 Female) during 1991 Census.

In January 2007, the Karnataka Government issued a notification to merge the areas under then Bangalore Mahanagara Palike with seven City municipal council (CMC)'s, one Town municipal council (TMC) and 110 villages around the city (including Baiyyappanahalli NMCT) to form a single administrative body, Bruhat Bengaluru Mahanagara Palike. The process was completed by April 2007 and the body was renamed Bruhat Bengaluru Mahanagara Palike (Greater Bangalore Municipal Corporation).

Transport
This locality is adjacent to Baiyappanahalli, a transport hub hosting
Baiyappanahalli metro station, 
Baiyappanahalli also hosts the Coaching depot for Metro service. Baiyyappanahalli railway station and Third coaching Terminal of Indian Railways, train station being built at the same space where Baiyyappanahalli Yard once stood.

Location

References

Neighbourhoods in Bangalore